St. John is a city in Rolette County, North Dakota, United States. The population was 322 at the 2020 census.

History
St. John was laid out in 1882.  The town took its name after a parish in Quebec, the native land of a local missionary. St. John was incorporated in 1903. A post office has been in operation in St. John since 1882. An early history of the town of St. John circa 1890 to 1912 can be found here  and.

Geography
St. John is the town in the United States closest to one of the few practical exclaves of the US.

Demographics

2010 census
As of the census of 2010, there were 341 people, 138 households, and 76 families residing in the city. The racial makeup of the city was 23.2% White, 0.3% African American, 66.0% Native American, 1.2% Asian, and 9.4% from two or more races. Hispanic or Latino of any race were 0.9% of the population.

There were 138 households, of which 38.4% had children under the age of 18 living with them, 28.3% were married couples living together, 20.3% had a female householder with no husband present, 6.5% had a male householder with no wife present, and 44.9% were non-families. 42.0% of all households were made up of individuals, and 17.4% had someone living alone who was 65 years of age or older. The average household size was 2.47 and the average family size was 3.37.

The median age in the city was 30.4 years. 30.5% of residents were under the age of 18; 10.8% were between the ages of 18 and 24; 25.8% were from 25 to 44; 22% were from 45 to 64; and 10.9% were 65 years of age or older. The gender makeup of the city was 47.2% male and 52.8% female.

2000 census
As of the census of 2000, there were 358 people, 142 households, and 91 families residing in the city. The population density was 1,217.1 people per square mile (476.6/km). There were 154 housing units at an average density of 523.6 per square mile (205.0/km). The racial makeup of the city was 37.99% White, 55.59% Native American, and 6.42% from two or more races. Hispanic or Latino of any race were 0.84% of the population.

There were 142 households, out of which 36.6% had children under the age of 18 living with them, 37.3% were married couples living together, 21.8% had a female householder with no husband present, and 35.9% were non-families. 33.1% of all households were made up of individuals, and 10.6% had someone living alone who was 65 years of age or older. The average household size was 2.52 and the average family size was 3.18.

In the city, the population was spread out, with 31.6% under the age of 18, 9.8% from 18 to 24, 25.7% from 25 to 44, 20.9% from 45 to 64, and 12.0% who were 65 years of age or older. The median age was 33 years. For every 100 females, there were 86.5 males. For every 100 females age 18 and over, there were 85.6 males.

The median income for a household in the city was $26,250, and the median income for a family was $40,208. Males had a median income of $25,714 versus $17,188 for females. The per capita income for the city was $12,294. About 15.6% of families and 16.2% of the population were below the poverty line, including 18.7% of those under age 18 and 10.5% of those age 65 or over.

Education
It is in the Belcourt School District.

See also
Turtle Mountain Indian Reservation

References

Cities in Rolette County, North Dakota
Cities in North Dakota
Populated places established in 1882
1882 establishments in Dakota Territory